Millennials are the generational demographic cohort born between 1981 and 1996, sometimes known as Generation Y.

Millennial or millennials may also refer to:
Relating to a millennium, a period of one thousand years
Millennialism, a set of beliefs advanced by some religious denominations
Millennial Media, advertising company founded May 2006 in Baltimore
Millennial (blog), Catholic young adult journal begun in 2012
Millennial (podcast), created by Megan Tan in 2015
Millennials (TV series), Argentinian telenovela begun in November 2018
Millennials (musical), a 2019 musical by Elliot Clay

See also
Generation Y (disambiguation)
Millenarianism